Fairmount Public School is a K–12 school in Fairmount, North Dakota that is the only school of the Fairmount School District 18.

References

External links
 Fairmount Public School

School districts in North Dakota
Education in Richland County, North Dakota
Elementary schools in North Dakota
Public middle schools in North Dakota
Public high schools in North Dakota
Buildings and structures in Richland County, North Dakota